Lomas de Sargentillo is a town located in Guayas, Ecuador. It is the seat of Lomas de Sargentillo Canton, created in 1992.

Lomas de Sargentillo Canton is one of the smallest cantons in Guayas. Its area is 67 km2. At the 2001 census, there were 14,194 people residing within canton limits.

Populated places in Guayas Province